K. Vijaya Bhaskar is Indian film director who works mainly in the Telugu film industry. He won the National Film Award for Best Feature Film in Telugu for Nuvve Kavali (2000). He is an alumnus of Sainik School, Korukonda.

Filmography

Awards
 National Film Award for Best Feature Film in Telugu - 2000
 Filmfare Award for Best Director - (2000, Nuvve Kavali)

References

External links
 

Living people
Telugu film directors
Filmfare Awards South winners
Hindi-language film directors
Sainik School alumni
People from Vizianagaram district
Film directors from Andhra Pradesh
20th-century Indian film directors
21st-century Indian film directors
People from Uttarandhra
Year of birth missing (living people)